Firebaugh High School may refer to:

 Firebaugh High School (Firebaugh, California)
 Marco Antonio Firebaugh High School, Lynwood, California